The 1964 West Virginia Mountaineers football team represented West Virginia University as a member of the Southern Conference (SoCon) during the 1964 NCAA University Division football season. Led by fifth-year head coach Gene Corum, the Mountaineers compiled an overall record of 7–4 with a mark of 5–0 in conference play, winning the SoCon title. West Virginia was invited to the Liberty Bowl, where the Mountaineers lost to Utah, 32–6.

Schedule

References

West Virginia
West Virginia Mountaineers football seasons
Southern Conference football champion seasons
West Virginia Mountaineers football